Hồng Thủy is a commune Lệ Thủy District, Quảng Bình Province, Vietnam. Local economy is mainly agricultural, rice production and cattle breeding.
National Route 1 crosses this communes. The commune perches on a sandy area.

Communes of Quảng Bình province